Laurence Power (31 July 1898 – 20 March 1963) was an Australian cricketer. He played in one first-class match for South Australia in 1920/21.

See also
 List of South Australian representative cricketers

References

External links
 

1898 births
1963 deaths
Australian cricketers
South Australia cricketers
Cricketers from Adelaide